WarCry is a Spanish power metal band, currently consisting of vocalist Víctor García, guitarists Pablo García and José Rubio, bassist Roberto García, and drummer Rafael Yugueros.

WarCry formed in 2001 when the members Víctor García and former drummer Alberto Ardines were expelled from Avalanch. They released two albums in less than a year and by the third release they had become one of the most important groups on the Spanish metal music scene. After the fourth album critics stated that WarCry is "one of the few bands in the Spanish heavy metal that actually reinvents itself steadily".  The band received many awards with their fifth album, and critics said, "Hats off, it's clear that WarCry is one of the best metal bands, not to say the best". They are noted for the use of keyboards, aggressive and fast drumming style, García's high pitched and gravel vocals, and twin-guitar sound. Allmusic's Evan Gutierrez stated that "already well-known throughout Spain, WarCry have begun to gain a reputation among metal enthusiasts throughout Latin America."

Awards

Radial Awards

2003

2004

2005

AMAS Awards
AMAS stands for Anuario de la Musica de Asturias (en: Asturias's Yearbook of Music).

Rockferendum
Rockferendum is an award held by votes from readers of the magazines Kerrang! and HeavyRock.

MetalZone

Other 
 WarCry received a gold certification for live album Directo A La Luz on September 18, 2006. 
 Heavy Metal Radio from Argentina, on August 15, 2007 awarded WarCry "International Band of the Month".

References

External links 
 WarCry's Website
 RafaBasa.com
 MetalZone.biz
 PremiosAmas.com

Awards
Lists of awards received by Spanish musician
Lists of awards received by musical group